Zakho District is a district in northwestern Dohuk Governorate in the Kurdistan Region of Iraq. The city of Zakho is the administrative center.

Subdistricts

The district has many sub-districts: 
Zakho
Ibrahim Khalil or Rizgari
Darkar 
Hizawa
Batifa

References

Districts of Dohuk Province
Zakho